Carsten Ball and Dustin Brown were the defending champions but chose not to defend their title.

Brian Baker and Matt Reid won the title after defeating Bjorn Fratangelo and Denis Kudla 6–1, 7–5 in the final.

Seeds

Draw

References
 Main Draw

Las Vegas Challenger - Doubles
Las Vegas Challenger